Dallas Car Sharks is an automotive reality show currently airing on Motor Trend that takes place in the Dallas–Fort Worth metroplex. It documents four competing car dealers (JD Cole, Martha Davis, Ash Rabah, and Tommy Spagnola) as they buy used cars at auction, refurbish them, and then attempt to flip (sell) them for a profit. Martha Davis and JD Cole are mother and son, and although they share a garage, their businesses are separate. 

The series, which premiered July 22, 2013, is produced by AMS Pictures, with Andy Streitfeld as its executive producer and Randy Martin as its senior producer. In August 2013, Discovery Communications senior vice president Robert Scanlon was promoted to general manager of Velocity, a network that he had helped to grow to No. 46 in the males aged 25–54 demographic with original shows such as Dallas Car Sharks, Fantomworks, and What's in the Barn? Scanlon also helped the network to move up 22 slots and out-deliver competing networks that had larger numbers of subscribers, such as NBA TV, MLB Network, and Golf Channel.

In March 2014, Discovery Communications announced that Dallas Car Sharks would return for its second season on April 2, 2014. Along with other similar programs such as Overhaulin', What's in the Barn?, and Wheeler Dealers, Dallas Car Sharks helped to drive ratings growth for Velocity in the second quarter of 2014, especially among male viewers and in the 25–54 age demographic. In April 2014, Dallas resident Bruce Kahn sued AMS Pictures for breach of fiduciary duty, claiming that the series was his idea and that he is entitled to profit sharing.

The show, along with other automotive reality programs such as Fantomworks, Garage Squad, Graveyard Carz, and West Coast Customs, has drawn criticism for both being too predictable in terms of plot and making automotive restoration look much easier than it actually is.

Series overview
{| class="wikitable" style="text-align:center"
|-
! style="padding: 0px 8px" colspan="2" rowspan="2"| Season
! style="padding: 0px 8px" rowspan="2"| Episodes
! style="padding: 0px 80px" colspan="2"| Originally aired
! scope="col" rowspan="2"|Average rating(millions)
|-
! Season premiere
! Season finale
|-
|style="background:#000;" height="10px"|
| 1
| 10
| July 23, 2013
| Sept. 24, 2013
| 
|-
|style="background:#b0c4de;" height="10px"|
| 2
| 10
| Apr. 2, 2014
| May 28, 2014
| 
|-
|style="background:#b0c4de;" height="10px"|
| 3
| 14
| Sep. 16, 2015
| Dec. 16, 2015
| 
|-
|}

Episodes

Season 1
Season one premiered on July 22, 2013.

Season 2 
Season two premiered on April 2, 2014.

References

External links
 
 Velocity's Dallas Car Sharks webpage

2013 American television series debuts
2010s American reality television series
Automotive television series
2015 American television series endings
Motor Trend (TV network) original programming